Ha! Ha! River may refer to:

 Ha! Ha! River (Gros-Mécatina), a watercourse flowing in Côte-Nord, Quebec, Canada
 Ha! Ha! River (Saguenay River), a watercourse flowing in Saguenay, Quebec, Canada

See also
Minnehaha